The Nikon F-mount teleconverters are a group of magnifying lenses mounted between the lens and  camera bodies using the Nikon F-mount. Currently, 1.4x, 1.7x and 2x converters are available separately; a fourth, the 1.25x, is available only with Nikon's newest 800mm supertelephoto lens.

Function
There are several generations, the newest are the E-II and the latest E-III series, which includes an aspherical lens.

Teleconverters need a fast lens for fast, reliable autofocus. Depending on brightness, contrast and needed autofocus-speed, one should have a minimum total aperture between 11 and 5.6. A total aperture of 8 corresponds to a lens aperture of 5.6, 4 and 2.8 with a 1.4x, 2x and 3x teleconverter, respectively. Sometimes teleconverters do not convert aperture and focal length data included in the Exif information, even if the actual focus and exposure still will be correct. Not every teleconverter will support autofocus with every lens. Teleconverters are often recommended only for lenses with minimum telephoto focal length or equivalent zoom range. All AF-I and AF-S teleconverters support lenses with optical image stabilization (Nikon VR).

Models

Compatibility information
Nikon AF-I and AF-S teleconverters will only mount original Nikon Nikkor AF-S and AF-I lenses (without modification). Modification needs removal of a small part. They are not recommended for use with Nikon DX format lenses although it mounts (with modification).

Although not recommended, teleconverters are used in the Nikon 1 series with Mount Adapter FT1 for extreme telephotos.

See also

Kenko (company)
Canon Extender EF
List of Nikon F-mount lenses with integrated autofocus motors

References

Nikon F-mount lenses
Teleconverter lenses